Gary Alan Fine (born May 11, 1950, in New York City) is an American sociologist and author.

Life and career 

The son of Bernard David Fine and Bernice Estelle Tanz, Fine grew up in Manhattan and went to the Horace Mann School. He studied psychology at the University of Pennsylvania (Phi Beta Kappa). He attended graduate school at Harvard University from 1972 to 1976 and received his PhD from Harvard in social psychology. His dissertation advisor was the eminent small group theorist Robert F. Bales.

In 1976, he became an assistant professor in the sociology department at the University of Minnesota. At various times, he was a visiting professor at Indiana University (1980), the University of Chicago (1985), the University of Bremen (1986), and the University of Iceland (1988). In 1988, he received the American Folklore Society's Opie Award for the Best Scholarly Book in the field of Children's Folklore and Culture for his work With The Boys, an ethnographic study of Little League baseball teams.

In 1990, he became the department head of the Department of Sociology at the University of Georgia, a position he held until 1993, after which he remained a professor. In 1990 he was also the President of the Society for the Study of Symbolic Interactionism. During the term of 1994 to 1995, he was a fellow at the Center for Advanced Study in the Behavioral Sciences, affiliated with Stanford University. He continued at the University of Georgia but accepted a position at Northwestern University in Evanston, Illinois beginning in 1997, where in 2005 he was named John Evans Professor. In 2002, he was the President of the Midwest Sociological Society, and in 2005 he was President of the Society for the Study of Social Problems. He remains at Northwestern and in 2003 was a fellow at the Swedish Collegium for Advanced Study in the Social Sciences at Uppsala University in Sweden. In 2005 and 2006, he was a visiting scholar at the Russell Sage Foundation in New York City. He is a former editor of Social Psychology Quarterly, an official journal of the American Sociological Association. He is married to Susan Hirsig Fine and has two children.

Academic focus 

Fine has written ethnographies of a number of diverse small group activities from analyses of Dungeons and Dragons players and mushroom hunters to high school policy debaters and restaurant workers. Fine maintains that these different groups and distinct areas connect: 

His work on rumor has made a substantial contribution to the understanding of urban legends and the transmission of rumors. In 2001, he co-authored a book with University of California-Davis Professor Patricia Turner on rumors in the African-American community and rumors and urban legends held by whites about blacks in the United States. He is currently researching rumors related to the September 11 attacks and terrorism. A recently published manuscript deals with the social production and communication of scientific work at the National Weather Service.

Another area of research includes the complicated historical and social reputations of figures such as Thorstein Veblen, Benedict Arnold, Fatty Arbuckle, Herman Melville, Vladimir Nabokov, Warren Harding, Sinclair Lewis, and Henry Ford. On August 4, 2004, several months before the 2004 Presidential Election, he set off a minor storm, especially in the political blogger community, with his op-ed piece in The Washington Post "Ire to the Chief" that argued that the commonly expressed hatreds of presidents George W. Bush, Bill Clinton, and Richard Nixon reflected their behavior and activities in youth more than their specific policies as President.

Fine is also a major figure in the study of the work of Erving Goffman and the theory of symbolic interactionism. He co-edited with Gregory W. H. Smith a major compilation of Goffman's work and of criticism and analysis of his contribution to the social sciences. Together with Kent Sandstrom and Dan Martin, he has produced a forthcoming textbook on symbolic interactionism entitled Symbols, Selves, and Social Reality: A Symbolic Interactionist Approach to Sociology and Social Psychology.

Specific areas

Restaurants 

In addition to his analysis of restaurant establishment culture in his 1996 book Kitchens: The Culture of Restaurant Work, Fine considers himself a sort of amateur restaurant critic. Through 2015, he maintained a blog, called Veal Cheeks, describing his restaurant visits while living in New York City. His writing style, punchy and wry, can also be seen in his review of Eric Schlosser's book, Fast Food Nation, for Reason magazine.

Art 

Another subject in which Fine has combined his personal and academic interests is art. While researching his book about outsider art Everyday Genius, he became well-acquainted with many of the major figures and artists in that segment of the art world. He studied the cases of major outsider (self-taught) artists like Henry Darger, Bill Traylor, Edgar Tolson, Thornton Dial, Lonnie Holley, Martin Ramirez, Sam Doyle, and Howard Finster. He is also an avid collector of outsider art himself. While researching the book and living in Georgia, he was a member of the Nexus Center for Contemporary Art and a board member at the High Museum of Art in Atlanta. He is also currently a board member of the Intuit: Center for Intuitive and Outsider Art in Chicago.

Policy Debate 
During his research for Gifted Tongues: High School Debate and Adolescent Culture, he followed and observed several high school policy debate teams in Minnesota. The book depicts an activity, although popular in United States, that is often seen as esoteric and confusing. His son, Todd David Fine, as described in the dedication to the book, first saw a video of the activity as a young child while Fine was researching the book. Apparently inspired, in high school, Todd, along with his partners Adam Goldstein and Julie Bashkin, went on to capture the national-circuit debate championship the Tournament of Champions and the Barkley Forum at Emory University, another major championship in the activity.

Works 

 (With Ralph Rosnow) Rumor and Gossip: The Social Psychology of Hearsay, Elsevier-North Holland (New York, NY), 1976.
 Shared Fantasy: Role Playing Games As Social Worlds, University of Chicago Press (Chicago, IL), 1983.
 Talking Sociology, Allyn and Bacon (Boston, MA), 1985.
 With the Boys: Little League Baseball and Preadolescent Culture, University of Chicago Press (Chicago, IL), 1987.
 (Editor) Meaningful Play, Playful Meaning, Human Kinetics Publishers (Champaign, IL), 1987.
 (With Kent L. Sandstrom) Knowing Children: Participant Observation with Minors, Sage (Newberry Park, CA), 1988.
 (Editor, with John Johnson and Harvey A. Farberman) Sociological Slices: Introductory Readings from the Interactionist Perspective, JAI Press (Greenwich, CT), 1992.
 Manufacturing Tales: Sex and Money in Contemporary Legends, University of Tennessee Press (Knoxville, TN), 1992.
 (Editor, with Karen Cook and James S. House) Sociological Perspectives on Social Psychology, Allyn and Bacon (Boston, MA), 1994.
 (Editor) A Second Chicago School?: The Development of a Postwar American Sociology, University of Chicago (Chicago, IL), 1995.
 Kitchens: The Culture of Restaurant Work, University of California (Berkeley, CA), 1996.
 Morel Tales: The Culture of Mushrooming, Harvard University Press (Cambridge, MA), 1998.
 (Editor, with Gregory W. H. Smith) Erving Goffman, Sage (Thousand Oaks, CA), 2000.
 Difficult Reputations: Collective Memories of the Evil, Inept, and Controversial, University of Chicago Press (Chicago, IL), 2001.
 Gifted Tongues: High School Debate and Adolescent Culture, Princeton University Press (Princeton, NJ), 2001.
 (With Patricia A. Turner) Whispers on the Color Line: Rumor and Race in America, University of California (Berkeley, CA), 2001.
 (With Daniel D. Martin and Kent L. Sandstrom) Symbols, Selves, and Social Life: A Symbolic Interactionist Approach, Roxbury (Los Angeles, CA), 2002.
 (With David Shulman) Talking Sociology, Fifth Edition. Allyn and Bacon (Boston, MA), 2003.
 Everyday Genius: Self-Taught Art and the Culture of Authenticity, University of Chicago Press (Chicago, IL), 2004.
 (With Kent Sandstrom and Daniel D. Martin) Symbols, Selves and Social Life: A Symbolic Interactionist Approach to Sociology and Social Psychology. Roxbury (Los Angeles, CA), In press.
  Players and Pawns: How Chess Builds Community and Culture, University of Chicago Press (Chicago, IL), 2015.
 Talking Art: The Culture of Practice and the Practice of Culture in MFA Education, University of Chicago Press (Chicago, IL), 2018.

References 

Contemporary Authors Online, Gale, 2005. Reproduced in Biography Resource Center. Farmington Hills, Mich.: Thomson Gale. 2005.

1950 births
American sociologists
Living people
University of Pennsylvania alumni
University of Michigan College of Literature, Science, and the Arts alumni
Northwestern University faculty
University of Minnesota faculty
Indiana University faculty
University of Chicago faculty
University of Georgia faculty
Horace Mann School alumni
American restaurant critics
American male non-fiction writers
Social Psychology Quarterly editors
Harvard University alumni